Synodontis ouemeensis is a species of upside-down catfish native to the Ogun, Ouémé and Mono river basins of Nigeria, Benin and Togo. This species grows to a length of  SL.

References

External links 

ouemeensis
Catfish of Africa
Freshwater fish of West Africa
Fish described in 2008